Professor Sir Bruce Edward Keogh, KBE, FMedSci, FRCS, FRCP (born 24 November 1954) is a Rhodesian-born  British surgeon who specialises in cardiac surgery. He was medical director of the National Health Service in England from 2007 and national medical director of the NHS Commissioning Board (NHS England) from 2013 until his retirement early in 2018. He is chair of Birmingham Women's and Children's NHS Foundation Trust.

Early life
Keogh was born on 24 November 1954 in Salisbury, Rhodesia (now Harare, Zimbabwe), the son of Gerald and Marjorie Beatrice Keogh (née Craig). His father held a senior position in the Civil service, having been Chief Inspector of Public Services for the Federation of Rhodesia and Nyasaland while his mother was a Hansard reporter in parliament. He attended the private Catholic boys school St George's College, Harare.

Clinical medical career (1980-2007)
Prior to becoming full-time NHS Medical Director in November 2007, Keogh practised as a cardiac surgeon with a special interest in reconstructive mitral valve surgery.

He earned a Bachelor of Science degree and MB BS degree from Charing Cross Hospital Medical School part of the University of London in 1977 and 1980 respectively.

He was a demonstrator in anatomy at Charing Cross Hospital Medical School before training in general surgery in London and Sheffield and gaining his FRCS in 1985. He then opted for a career in cardiac surgery, returning to the Hammersmith Hospital as a registrar. During this time he spent a year as a laboratory-based British Heart Foundation Junior Research Fellow which led to the award of the MD higher degree in 1989 for research into laser coronary angioplasty. He was appointed as senior registrar on the West London training rotation where he spent time at St George's Hospital and the Harefield Hospital training in cardiac, pulmonary and oesophageal surgery. He was subsequently appointed a university Senior Lecturer in cardiothoracic surgery at the Royal Postgraduate Medical School and honorary consultant surgeon at the Hammersmith Hospital between 1991 and 1995. He then took an NHS consultant position in Birmingham where he became the clinical service lead for cardiothoracic surgery and Associate Medical Director for Clinical Governance at University Hospital Birmingham before being appointed Professor of cardiac surgery at University College London and director of surgery at The Heart Hospital in 2004.

In 1994 he established the National Adult Cardiac Surgical Database and as a consequence, he is perhaps best known for his work promoting the measurement, analysis and public disclosure of clinical outcomes. But he has also published numerous peer-reviewed scientific articles on coronary artery vasomotor tone, the effect of cardiopulmonary bypass on gut blood flow and function, myocardial protection during surgery, surgery for patients with poor left ventricular function and the effects of social deprivation on cardiac surgical outcomes. He has co-authored a book on the Evidence for Cardiothoracic Surgery (2005) and another on Normal Surface Anatomy (1984). While at UCL he brought the national registries on adult and pediatric cardiac surgery, myocardial infarction, coronary angioplasty and pacemakers into a new National Institute for Cardiovascular Outcomes Research 

His work with Paolo Camici using PET scanning to identify hibernating myocardium in people with heart failure in the mid 1990s helped transform surgery for heart failure worldwide. He performed the first successful transabdominal, off pump gastroepiploic artery bypass graft to the heart in the UK and was among the first to adopt minimally invasive, direct coronary artery bypass surgery, thoracoscopic mitral valve surgery and warm blood cardioplegia for myocardial protection.

Keogh has been active on many medical and professional committees. He has been secretary and president of the Society for Cardiothoracic Surgery in Great Britain and Ireland, Secretary General of the European Association for Cardio-Thoracic Surgery and president of the Cardiothoracic Section of the Royal Society of Medicine and served on the Council of the Royal College of Surgeons of England and the board of directors of the Society of Thoracic Surgeons in the US. He is an elected member of the American Association for Thoracic Surgery and a Fellow of the European Society of Cardiology. In addition, he has served as a member of the Civil Aviation Authority Medical Advisory Panel, and on the trustee board for the National Confidential Enquiry into Patient Outcome and Death and the Board of the Picker Institute. He has sat on the editorial boards of Heart and the Journal of the Royal Society of Medicine. He has been a British Heart Foundation junior research fellow, senior lecturer, member of the Research Grants Committee and Council member.

Prior to becoming medical director of the National Health Service, he served on the National Coronary Heart Disease Taskforce, the NHS Standing Medical Advisory Committee, and was chairman of the NHS Information Taskforce on Clinical Outcomes for the Department of Health. He has also served as Commissioner on the Commission for Health Improvement and the Healthcare Commission, where he chaired the Clinical Strategy Group.

Given his long-standing interest in measuring and publishing clinical outcomes as a driver for improving quality, in 2007 he was asked by Patricia Hewitt, then Secretary of State for Health, to assist Tim Kelsey in establishing a new health website, "NHS Choices". Keogh's role was to ensure credible clinical content. He chaired the clinical advisory group and subsequently went on to chair the NHS Choices Board.

NHS Medical Director (2007–13)

As medical director of the NHS (2007–13) he was a director general in the Department of Health where he led the Medical Directorate, which had oversight for clinical policy and strategy in the NHS. This included the work of the National Clinical Directors and their associated strategies such as those for coronary heart disease, stroke, cancer, respiratory disease, renal disease, liver disease, trauma, and transplantation. He established the Healthcare Quality Improvement Partnership (HQIP)a joint venture between the Academy of Medical Royal Colleges and the Royal College of Nursing to develop and run the national clinical audits.

Keogh's role also included oversight of the medicines supply chain into the UK, policy relating to the pharmaceutical industry, drug pricing, prescriptions and the role of pharmacy in England and sponsorship of the work programmes of the National Institute for Health and Clinical Excellence (NICE), the NHS regulator the Healthcare Commission and the National Patient Safety Agency (NPSA), including the National Confidential Enquiries and the National Research Ethics Service. Through sponsorship of Medical Education England (MEE) a product of the 2008 Darzi review of the NHS, he had oversight of postgraduate education of doctors, dentists, pharmacists and clinical scientists, but this was superseded by Health Education England (HEE) in 2012 to  ensure a balanced and integrated approach to all healthcare professionals.

He opposed the establishment of the Cancer Drugs Fund which he believed would undermine NICE and the quest for an evidence based NHS. He was subsequently responsible for drawing together NICE, cancer charities and the pharmaceutical industry to lay the groundwork for a revised evidence driven CDF which went live under NICE in 2017.

Keogh's team was responsible for implementing the majority of the recommendations from Lord Darzi's review of the NHS "High Quality Care for All" published in 2008. This review has been credited with refocusing the NHS on quality of care. Keogh's team also developed the Quality Framework for the NHS (based on the work of Sheila Leatherman) and included in Darzi's review. The principles were simple: Define what is meant by quality, measure it, publish it for everyone to see, reward those who do well, regulate for minimum standards, promote and develop leadership for quality within the NHS and promote research and innovation within the NHS, by drawing on and linking with the best British universities and biotechnology companies in to form academic science networks. The resultant definition of healthcare quality based on the provision of effective care, safe care and a positive experience became widely accepted and was subsequently enshrined in the Health and Social Care Act (2012).

In 2011, after the collapse of the British Association of Medical Managers, he established the Faculty of Medical Leadership and Management under the jurisdiction of the Medical Royal Colleges in order to ensure access to all doctors, not just those in leadership or management positions. He subsequently asked the Faculty to administer the National Medical Director's Clinical Fellows Scheme which had grown out of the Clinical Advisor Scheme in the Department of Health, thereby ensuring a long-term home for the programme. The following year, he helped to establish a shadowing period for new Foundation Trainees.

NHS England (2013-18)
Following the election of a coalition Government in 2010, he was tasked with making clinical outcomes the currency of NHS business. In response, his team developed the NHS Outcomes Framework which was based on the observation that all healthcare systems should do five things well: Firstly, the NHS should stop you dying prematurely from things they could influence through treatment or prevention through immunisations e.g. stroke, heart attacks, measles. Secondly, the NHS should look after you well if you have a long-term medical condition such as diabetes, asthma, arthritis. Thirdly, the NHS should treat you effectively if you need a short episode of care e.g. broken leg, an operation or infection. Fourthly, the NHS should treat you well. The experience should be as positive as possible, ranging from participation in decisions about your treatment to decent customer service. Finally, the NHS should treat you safely. All of these are measurable at different levels. They also dovetail with the definition of quality in the three domains of effectiveness, safety, and experience.

The five domains of the NHS Outcomes Framework have formed the basis of the Government's Mandate to NHS England and NHS England's planning guidance for the NHS where they give clarity of purpose and direction to the NHS in a way that was previously undefined. He has argued that the role of NHS England is to "turn taxpayers money into good clinical outcomes".

Following the Lansley reforms of the NHS, he was appointed National Medical Director in NHS England from 2013, where he is responsible for promoting a focus on quality, clinical leadership and innovation. To facilitate these aims he was responsible for overseeing the establishment of Academic Health Science Networks, Strategic Clinical Networks and Clinical Senates. He put clinicians at the heart of NHS England through the Chief Pharmaceutical, Dental, Scientific and Allied Health Professions officers, a primary care deputy, a medical director for specialised commissioning, regional medical directors and pharmacists, area medical directors, over 20 expert national clinical directors and junior doctors, pharmacists and dentists through the National Medical Director's Clinical Fellowship Scheme.

With the advent of medical revalidation, he became the senior responsible officer for doctors in England.

In November 2014 Keogh oversaw the publication of around 5,000 consultant surgeons' mortality and procedure related-complication rates. He warned that a further 2,500 who did not share this information would face penalties.

In April 2017, Keogh announced that he would be stepping down at the end of the year and in January 2018, left NHS England to become chair of Birmingham Women's and Children's NHS Foundation Trust.

National reviews

In 2008, while interim Director General for Informatics in the Department of Health, Keogh undertook a National Health Informatics review. He argued for a Chief Information Officer for Health and the development of associated career structures in the NHS. He also highlighted the need to "focus on clinical metrics that improve quality, in the context of patient safety, patient experience and patient outcomes. The lack of a national set of clinical outcome and quality measures has slowed progress towards a culture of continuous quality improvement. It has prevented meaningful institutional comparisons and deprived the public of essential information...".

In 2009 Keogh led a national taskforce to improve neonatal services.

In 2012 he co-chaired a review of medical and dental school intakes, with Sir Graeme Catto, on behalf of the Higher Education Funding Council and the Department of Health.

In 2012 he was asked by the Secretary of State for Health to investigate the safety of PIP breast implants, a product of fraudulent quality, but concluded that although they were more likely to rupture than other implants they did not pose significant health risk to women a finding endorsed by a subsequent European report. in 2013

In 2012 Keogh ordered a review of the national quality assurance frameworks and governance for pathology services with the aim of making the process more robust and transparent. This was prompted by a series of misdiagnoses at Kingsmill Hospital, which had negatively affected the care of a number of women with breast cancer. 
 The review reported in 2014.

In 2013, he published four significant reports:

One on how to improve safety in the cosmetic intervention industry through a review of regulation with hard hitting recommendations. An independent review of the related ethical issues by The Nuffield Council on Bioethics concluded that, "all recommendations in the 2013 Keogh review of the regulation of cosmetic interventions should be implemented in full".
A second, widely known as the Keogh Review on the 14 Trusts with the highest mortality rates in England. The way these were conducted formed the basis for the subsequent Care Quality Commission hospital inspections.
A third, presenting a vision for the future of urgent and emergency care services in England.
A fourth proposing the provision of better NHS weekend services. which was approved by the NHS England Board in December 2013.

In 2017 he wrote to Jeremy Hunt the Secretary of State for Health recommending changes to the way ambulance response times were monitored in order to ensure the sickest patients received the quickest response. The recommendations based on a rigorous review of 14 million 999 calls were accepted and implemented.

In 2019 he led a review for the Independent Healthcare Providers Network aimed at improving clinical governance in independent healthcare providers in the UK.

Controversies

In 2012 Keogh was asked by Jeremy Hunt, Secretary of State for Health, to reassure him that there had been adequate clinical consultation on proposals to reconfigure services in south London. In a letter to Hunt Keogh concluded that there had been adequate clinical consultation, but he also included a warning about closing Lewisham A&E. His advice was seen by some as an intervention to protect and prevent the closure of Lewisham A&E and by others as the opposite. Much debate centred around a projection regarding the number of lives that might be saved, a calculation of unknown origin – attributed by some to Keogh and by others to work conducted by the London Clinical Senate.

In 2013 Keogh provoked the suspension of children's heart surgery in Leeds just before the Easter weekend, based on evidence from Professor Roger Boyle, the former national heart czar and director of the National Institute for Cardiovascular Outcomes Research, that the mortality rate was 2.75 times higher than might be expected for their practice. Keogh was also concerned that one consultant surgeon was suspended from operating, that the senior consultant was on holiday and that the remaining surgeons were locums. The hospital could not contradict the mortality figures, so he suggested suspending surgery till the full facts could be verified. It subsequently turned out that Leeds had submitted poor data, 20 times more missing data than any other unit in the country, despite the fact that one of their cardiologists ran the national registry. After Leeds had submitted accurate and complete data, analysis showed that although they still had the highest mortality in the country they were within normal statistical boundaries. His intervention was widely regarded as sensible and preemptory given the evidence, but some thought it precipitous. Keogh remained unrepentant, arguing he would rather be remembered for preventing an avoidable disaster and embedding the "precautionary principle" in NHS safety culture, than responsible for not acting on reasonable doubt. He cited examples of "prevarication" at Bristol in the 1990s and Mid Stafforshire in the 2000s when some people argued over data while other people were harmed.

In 2014 he told the Parliamentary Health Select Committee that there was "extreme skepticism" in the NHS that the £1.6 billion of NHS money being transferred to local government as the Better Care Fund would be used for the benefit of NHS patients. He expressed concern that it would "be used for filling in potholes" as local councils grappled with their priorities and funding cuts. The remark attracted opprobrium from local government and support in equal measure from NHS commentators.

Ahead of proposed industrial action in England by junior doctors, NHS England published a letter from Keogh to the BMA which made reference to the November 2015 Paris attacks. The letter sought reassurance regarding the impact of the proposed strike, including clarification that the BMA would call off the strike in the event of a terrorist attack. On 7 January 2016, The Independent newspaper revealed details of involvement from the Department of Health and the Secretary of State for Health, Jeremy Hunt. The Independent article stated: "In one email, sent the day before the strike was declared, Sir Bruce was told by a DoH official that the risk of a “major incident” would be “pressed quite hard in the media once the strike is formally announced” and he was advised that “the more hard-edged you can be on this, the better”. The leak also revealed that Hunt agreed Sir Bruce would not be asked to speak to the media on the day the strike was declared “so long as” his letter reiterated his opposition to strike action. A British Medical Association spokesperson has since openly condemned these actions by saying: "This level of political interference is extremely concerning and will only serve to worsen junior doctor’s lack of trust in the Government’s handling of negotiations".

Non-NHS 
He chairs Sensyne Health an AIM listed clinical AI biotechnology company and is a director of LumiraDx, a point-of-care diagnostic company. He is a non executive director of the National Institute for Health and Care Excellence and the UK Government sponsored Cell and Gene Therapy Catapult promoting advanced medicinal therapy development in the UK.

He chairs a medical research charity The Scarfree Foundation, the British Heart Foundation Clinical Research Collaborative, the Birmingham Women's and Children's Hospitals charity and the Ex Fide Fiducia Trust supporting his old school in Zimbabwe.

Honours
Keogh was appointed as an honorary Knight Commander of the Order of the British Empire (KBE) in 2003. He subsequently became a British citizen, and as part of the Queen's Birthday Honours on 11 June 2005, his knighthood became substantive (back dated to 5 February 2004).

Keogh is an honorary Fellow of the Royal College of Physicians of London, the Royal College of General Practitioners, the Royal College of Anaesthetists, the Royal College of Paediatrics and Child Health, the Royal College of Surgeons in Ireland, the American College of Surgeons, the American Surgical Association, the British Society of Interventional Radiology and the British Association of Aesthetic and Plastic Surgeons. He has been a visiting professor at universities in Japan, China and North America. Closer to home he has been King James IV Professor of the Royal College of Surgeons of Edinburgh (2005) and Tudor Edwards lecturer (2007), and Hunterian Orator (2013) for the Royal College of Surgeons of England and Kinmonth Lecturer (2013) jointly for the Royal College of Surgeons of England and the Vascular Society of Great Britain and Ireland. In 2009 he delivered the Hunterian Society Oration. In 2014 he delivered the inaugural John Snow Oration for the Royal College of Anaesthetists.

He holds honorary medical doctorates from the universities of Birmingham and Sheffield and Doctorates of Science from the University of Toledo and Coventry University.

On World Thrombosis Day in 2016 he received an Outstanding Achievement Award in Parliament from Thrombosis UK for establishing and overseeing a national strategy for reducing venous thromboembolism in hospitals in England

In 2013, 2014 and 2015 he was ranked by the Health Service Journal as the most influential clinician in the English NHS. He is consistently ranked as one of the most powerful people in the NHS and in 2014 he was included in the Sunday Times and Debretts list of Britain's 500 most influential people. As of 2015, Keogh was paid a salary of between £190,000 and £194,999 by NHS England, making him one of the 328 most highly paid people in the British public sector at that time.

Personal life
Keogh has been married to his wife Ann since they met at medical school. The couple have four sons.

References

NHS Chief Professional Officers
Naturalised citizens of the United Kingdom
Fellows of the Royal College of Surgeons
Knights Commander of the Order of the British Empire
British cardiac surgeons
Living people
1954 births
Administrators in the National Health Service
21st-century British medical doctors
Alumni of St. George's College, Harare
Alumni of Charing Cross Medical School
Zimbabwean people of Irish descent
People from Harare